9TV (formerly branded as Solar News Channel) was a major commercial television network in the Philippines. It was owned by Nine Media Corporation, Nine Media had an airtime agreement as the main content provider of Radio Philippines Network. 9TV was the replacement of the Solar News Channel who have been retired the "Solar" branding. Broadcast 18 hours daily from 6:00 AM to 12:00 MN on free TV, while 24 hours a day on cable and satellite TV providers and thru live streaming.

Its flagship television station was DZKB-TV channel 9 in Mega Manila and other regional originating and relay stations in the Philippines.

Most of its live programming of the network are from the main studios located at Upper Ground Floor of the Worldwide Corporate Center, Shaw Boulevard corner Epifanio de los Santos Avenue in Mandaluyong with transmitter at No. 97, Panay Avenue, Brgy. South Triangle, Quezon City.

The channel ceased broadcasting on March 15, 2015, and was replaced by CNN Philippines on March 16, 2015.

History
9TV was launched on August 23, 2014, at 12:00am as a replacement for Solar News Channel. Its first show as 9TV was the replay of Nightly News. Solar News, the network's news arm was rebranded as 9News. The rebranding of the network came after Antonio Cabangon Chua's acquisition of Tieng's share of both STVNI (which turned into Nine Media Corporation) and RPN to ALC Group of Companies due to the Tieng's loss of revenue after investing on RPN.

The newscasts, current affairs programs and public service programs carried from the SNC format and the personnel was retained. It is also beefed up their weekend programming including cartoons, infotainment programs, reality, and infomercials to cater more viewers.

Rebranding stage took almost 7 months until 9TV will be rebranded into CNN Philippines that launched on March 16, 2015. 9News inked a partnership deal with international news network CNN.

As part of transition to CNN Philippines, 9TV temporarily used green screen as their news studio while their main newsroom and studio is under renovation in December 2014 and 9TV newscasts and current affairs programs began adopting CNN-themed graphics a week later (January 15, 2015). Some non-CNN programming (NBC and CBS shows), as well as Home Shopping Network (now Shop TV) and Kids Weekend (now currently CNN Philippines Junior) block were axed in the coming months.

Affiliate

References

External links
9TV official website
9News official website

Radio Philippines Network
Television networks in the Philippines
Defunct television networks in the Philippines
Television channels and stations established in 2014
Television channels and stations disestablished in 2015
24-hour television news channels in the Philippines
English-language television stations in the Philippines
Filipino-language television stations

ceb:9TV
ilo:9TV
tl:9TV